Somprasong Promsorn (born May 30, 1997) is a Thai professional footballer who plays as a left winger for Thai League 3 club Phitsanulok.

Club career

Leicester City
In youth career he was trained for 2 years and a half at Leicester City in England.

Honours
Phitsanulok
 Thai League 3 Northern Region: 2022–23

References
Soccerway
LiveSoccer888
Goal.com

1997 births
Living people
Somprasong Promsorn
Association football forwards
Thai expatriate sportspeople in England
Thai expatriate sportspeople in Belgium
Somprasong Promsorn
Somprasong Promsorn
Somprasong Promsorn